Walter Kapps (September 13, 1907 - February 1, 1975), was a French film director.

Partial filmography 
 1936 : Les Gaietés du palace
 1937 : Pantins d'amour
 1939 : 
 1942 : 
 1943 : Mahlia la métisse
 1947 : Une aventure de Polop
 1947 : 
 1947 : 
 1955 : Mademoiselle from Paris 
 1957 : 
 1959 : 
 1960 : Amour, autocar et boîtes de nuit

External links 
 

French film directors
1907 births
1975 deaths
French expatriates in the Ottoman Empire